The 1996–97 Deutsche Eishockey Liga season was the 3rd season of the Deutsche Eishockey Liga.

Adler Mannheim became the DEL Champion, winning a German title for the second time in their history. Both the Ratinger Löwen and Wedemark Scorpions earned their keep in the league playing against 1st League EHC Neuwied and TSV Erding.

The Bosman ruling, a 1995 decision of the European Court of Justice regarding the movement of labor in soccer, had profound influence on the league. The old Bundesliga had national character: German clubs competing for the German title with mostly German players. After the ruling European Union players were excluded from the "foreign" player quota. Within a year, the DEL teams employed 97 EU players and lowered their costs significantly, enabling the smaller teams to compete more effectively. The frequent player moves were not viewed positively by the fans.

Another visible change for the fans was the change in corporate sponsorship. The Krombacher Brewery ended their agreement with the league, resulting in a change in the league logo design. The league would not have a corporate sponsor again until 2003, when the German Yellow Pages signed two consecutive 3-year agreements.

Regular season
The mode of play changed for this season. In the first round, all teams played one home and one away game with each other for a total of 30 rounds. The first 6 placed teams continued playing for the playoff placements ), and the teams 7-16 played to against relegation/playdowns, with only the 2 best-placed teams in this group being eligible for playoffs.

Phase I

GP = Games, W = Win, T = Tie, L = Loss, OTL = Overtime loss, GF:GA = Goals For : Goals Against
 = Continue play for playoff spots,  = Continue play against relegation

Phase II - "Meisterrunde"

GP = Games, W = Win, T = Tie, L = Loss, OTL = Overtime loss, GF:GA = Goals For : Goals Against

Phase II - "Relegationsrunde"
The first two placed teams qualified for the playoff spots 7 and 8.

GP = Games, W = Win, T = Tie, L = Loss, OTL = Overtime loss, GF:GA = Goals For : Goals Against
Color code:  = Playoff  = Playdowns

Playdowns

First round
The first round was played in the best-of-seven mode.

Second round
The second round was played in a best-of-five mode.

Wedemark Scorpions (now known as Hannover Scorpions) and Ratinger Löwen had to play against the first two placed teams of the second league.

Relegation
The relegation round was played in a best-of-three mode.

Both the Ratinger Löwen and Wedemark Scorpions earned their keep in the DEL.

Playoffs
All playoff rounds were played in as a best-of-five series, with the better placed team playing Home-Away-Home-Away-Home.

Quarterfinals

Semifinals

Finals

With the last game, the Adler Mannheim became first time DEL Champion and won the German Champion title for the 2nd 8th time in the club history.

Player awards

References

DEL
Ger
Deutsche Eishockey Liga seasons